Wolters is a Dutch and German patronymic surname equivalent to the English Walters. 
People with the surname Wolters include:

 Albert M. Wolters (b. 1942), Dutch professor of Religion & Theology
 Carsten Wolters (b. 1969), German footballer
 Clifton Wolters (1909–1991), English Anglican priest
 Daniella Wolters (b. 1975), American actress
 Frans Wolters (1943–2005), Dutch politician
 Frederick Wolters (1904–1990), American field hockey player 
 Friedrich Wolters (1876–1930), German historian, poet and translator
 Hans Edmund Wolters (1915–1991), German ornithologist
 Jannes Wolters (b. 1979), Dutch footballer
 John Wolters (born 1940), American sprint canoeist
 John Wolters (1945–1997), American drummer
 Jürgen Wolters (1940–2015), German econometrician specializing in time series analysis
 Kara Wolters (b. 1975), American basketball player
 Nate Wolters (b. 1991), American basketball player
 O. W. Wolters (1915–2000), British historian
 Randy Wolters (b. 1990), Dutch footballer
 Raymond Wolters (1938–2020), American historian
 Reinhard Wolters (b. 1958), German historian
 Rudolf Wolters (1903–1983), German architect and government official
 Rynie Wolters (1842–1917), Dutch Major League Baseball player
 Teun Wolters (b. 1948), Dutch economist and applied research professor in corporate sustainability
 Tony Wolters (b. 1992), American baseball player

Named after people with the surname Wolters
 Fort Wolters, US military installation
 :de:Hofbrauhaus Wolters, German brewery
 Wolters Kluwer, Dutch information services and publishing company

See also
 Walters (surname)
 Wolter
 Wollter
 Wouters

Dutch-language surnames
Patronymic surnames